Donald Wallace Livingstone (1 October 1948 – 15 October 2015) was a politician in Queensland, Australia.

Early life
Donald Wallace Livingstone was born in Kingaroy, Queensland on 1 October 1948. He moved to Ipswich at the age of seven. He was married to his wife Cheryl in October 1972; the couple had two children. Livingstone and his wife owned two delicatessens, earning him the nickname "Deli Don".

Politics
Livingstone was a policy advisor to the Minister for Public Works and Housing before entering politics himself. He was the Labor Party's Queensland campaign director 1983–1986, and served on Ipswich City Council from 1985 to 1990. In 1989, he was elected to the Legislative Assembly of Queensland as the Labor member for Ipswich West. In 1998, he was defeated by Jack Paff, the One Nation candidate. Livingstone defeated Paff (running for the City Country Alliance) in 2001, and served until his retirement in 2006.

Later life
Livingstone died from stomach cancer at the Ipswich Hospice on 15 October 2015. Several hundred people attended his funeral at the North Ipswich Reserve on 20 October 2015. At the funeral, Ipswich mayor Paul Pisasale announced that he would honour Livingstone's dying wish to see the hospice's car parking and pedestrian crossing upgraded. He was buried at Warrill Park Cemetery.

Legacy
The bridge over the Bremer River at One Mile/Leichhardt was named the Don Livingstone One Mile Bridge in February 2015.

References

1948 births
2015 deaths
Members of the Queensland Legislative Assembly
People from Kingaroy
Australian Labor Party members of the Parliament of Queensland
21st-century Australian politicians